Kallyntrosternidius bucarensis is a species of beetle in the family Cerambycidae, the only species in the genus Kallyntrosternidius.

References

Acanthocinini